Route 27 may refer to:

Route 27 (MTA Maryland), a bus route in Baltimore, Maryland
London Buses route 27

See also
List of highways numbered 27

27